Arabella Dorman (born 1975 in London) is a British war artist and portrait painter. She was chosen as one of the BBC's "100 Women" in 2014.

Life
Dorman was born in 1975 in London. She studied at the Byam Shaw School of Art in London (since absorbed into Central Saint Martins) and the University of Edinburgh. She is married to Dominic Elliot, a film maker.

In 2006 Dorman was Britain's first official war artist to go to the front line in Iraq after being invited by Lt Gen Richard Shirreff, who had purchased one of her works. She started her time in Iraq with the Royal Green Jackets in Basra Palace, where she frequently came under enemy fire, then went to the desert near the Iranian border. She spent time with British forces in Afghanistan in 2009-2014. In 2009 she was embedded with 2nd Battalion, The Rifles in Sangin, Helmand, though she was not allowed to accompany soldiers on patrol, and in 2010 travelled within Afghanistan from her base in Kabul.

She worked with refugees in Lesbos, Calais and Dunkirk in 2015 and 2016. In December 2015 she created an art installation by suspending a dinghy, which had been used to transport refugees across the Mediterranean, from the roof of St James's Church, Piccadilly. Called Flight, the exhibit was on display until February 2016, and related the flight of refugees to the ancient tradition of hanging boats from church roofs.

Dorman has exhibited at venues including the Imperial War Museum, the Frost and Reed Gallery, and La Galleria Pall Mall.

References

External links

1975 births
Living people
20th-century English painters
21st-century English painters
20th-century English women artists
21st-century English women artists
Alumni of the Byam Shaw School of Art
Alumni of the University of Edinburgh
Artists from London
BBC 100 Women
British war artists
English women painters
People educated at St Mary's School, Calne